Ma che musica maestro is a 1971 Italian "musicarello" film directed by Mariano Laurenti.  It is loosely based on the William Shakespeare's tragedy Romeo and Juliet.

Plot    
Between the two villages of Santa Veronica Bassa and Santa Veronica Alta there is a heated rivalry. When Gianni, a citizen of S.V. Bassa, falls in love with Juliet, a citizen of the enemy village, the two fractions collide with each other to prevent the engagement. The return of Pompeo, an explorer believed to have been lost in Africa for many years, manages to restore peace between the two lovers and the fractions.

Cast 
Gianni Nazzaro: Gianni
Agostina Belli: Giulietta Ciova
Franco Scandurra: Pompeo Ciova
Franco Franchi: Franco 
Ciccio Ingrassia: Ciccio
Mario Maranzana: mayor
Elio Crovetto: priest
Umberto D'Orsi: On. Morbilloni
Gigi Reder
Didi Perego  
Enzo Andronico
Tiberio Murgia
Ignazio Leone
Ugo Adinolfi 
Luca Sportelli
Nino Vingelli

See also    
 List of Italian films of 1971

References

External links

Ma che musica maestro at Variety Distribution

1971 films
Musicarelli
Films based on Romeo and Juliet
1970s musical comedy films
Films directed by Mariano Laurenti
1971 comedy films
1970s Italian films